Euphorbia hamaderoensis is a species of plant in the family Euphorbiaceae. It is endemic to Yemen.  Its natural habitat is rocky areas.

References

hamaderoensis
Endemic flora of Socotra
Endangered flora of Asia
Taxonomy articles created by Polbot
Taxobox binomials not recognized by IUCN